The given name Xavier is a masculine name derived from the 16th-century Spanish Navarrese Roman Catholic Saint Francis Xavier.

Etymology
Xavier comes from the name of the Jesuit missionary saint Francis Xavier, where Xavier stands for his birthplace of Javier (Xabier in Basque; Xavier in Old Spanish) in the Kingdom of Navarre. The toponym is itself the romanization of the Basque place-name (and surname) etxe berri, meaning 'castle', 'new house' or 'new home'.

People

Arts
Xavier Abraham (born 1945), Spanish poet
Xavier Abril (1905–1990), Peruvian poet
Xavier Armange (born 1947), French writer and illustrator
Xavier Arsène-Henry (1919–2009), French modernist architect and urban planner
Xavier Atencio (1919–2017), American animator for The Walt Disney Company
Xavier Barbier de Montault (1830–1901), French liturgical writer
Xavier Blum Pinto (born 1957), Ecuadorian artist
Xavier Boniface Saintine (1798–1865), French dramatist and novelist
Xavier Cortada (born 1964), Cuban-American painter
Xavier Cugat (1900–1990), Spanish-Cuban bandleader
Xavier Davis (born 1971), American jazz pianist
Xavier de Planhol (1926–2016), French historical scholar
Xavier Dolan (born 1989), Canadian actor and filmmaker
Xavier Fagnon (born 1972), French voice actor
Xavier Forneret (1809–1884), French poet, playwright and writer
Xavier Fourcade (1926–1987), French American art dealer
Xavier Herbert (1901–1984), Australian writer
Xavier Martinez (1869–1943), American artist of Mexican descent
Xavier Naidoo (born 1971), German singer-songwriter
Xavier Rudd (born 1978), Australian singer-songwriter
Xavier Samuel (born 1983), Australian actor

Law, military and politics 
 Xavier Albertini (born 1971), French politician
 Xavier Becerra (born 1958), American Democrat
 Xavier Bertrand (born 1965), French politician
 Xavier Bettel (born 1973), Luxembourgian politician
 Xavier Bout de Marnhac (born 1951), French military general
 Xavier Brasseur (1865–1912), Luxembourgian politician
 Xavier Breton (born 1962), French politician
 Xavier Connor (1917–2005), Australian judge
 Xavier Coppolani (1866–1905), French military leader
 Xavier Darcos (born 1947), French politician
 Xavier, Duke of Parma and Piacenza (1889–1977), pretender to the defunct throne of Parma, and Carlist claimant to the throne of Spain
 Xavier de Magallon (1866–1956), French poet, translator and politician
 Xavier Espot Zamora (born 1979), Andorran politician and current prime minister of Andorra

Sports
Xavier Adibi (born 1984), American NFL player
Xavier Aguado (born 1968), Spanish association football player
Xabi Alonso (born 1981), Spanish association football player
Xavier Báez (born 1987), Mexican association football player
Xavier Barrau (born 1982), French association football player
Xavier Beitia (born 1982), American AFL and college football player
Xavier Bertoni (born 1988), French freestyle skier
Xavier Capdevila Romero (born 1976), Andorran ski mountaineer
Xavier Carter (born 1985), American track and field athlete
Xavier Chen (born 1983), Belgian association football player
Xavier Clarke (born 1983), indigenous Australian rules football player
Xavier Coleman (born 1995), American football player
Xavier Comas Guixé (born 1977), Andorran ski mountaineer
Xavier Corosine (born 1985), French basketball player
Xavier Crawford (born 1995), American football player
Xavier Daufresne (born 1968), Belgian tennis player
Xavier Delisle (born 1977), Canadian ice hockey player
Xavier Dirceu (born 1977), Brazilian association football player
Xavier Doherty (born 1982), Australian cricketer
Xavier Dorfman (born 1973), French Olympic rower
Xavier Downwind (1893–1968), American NFL player
Xavier Edwards (born 1999), American baseball player
Xavier Ellis (born 1988), Australian rules football player
Xavier Eluère (1897–1967), French Olympic boxer
Xavier Escudé (born 1966), Spanish Olympic field hockey player
Xavier Florencio (born 1979), Spanish road bicycle racer
Xavier Fulton (born 1986), American NFL player
Xavier Henry (born 1991), American NBA player
Xavier Hernández Creus or Xavi (born 1980), Spanish association football manager and former player
Xavier Hutchinson (born 2000), American football player
Xavier Jones (born 1997), American football player
Xavier Kelly (born 1997), American football player
Xavier Maassen (born 1980), Dutch racing driver
Xavier McDaniel (born 1963), American basketball player
Xavier McKinney (born 1999), American football player
Xavier Malisse (born 1980), Belgian tennis player
Xavier Margairaz (born 1984), Swiss association football player
 Xavier Munford (born 1992), American basketball player
Xavier Nady (born 1978), American former baseball player
Xavier Newman-Johnson (born 1999), American football player
Xavier Ouellet (born 1993), French-Canadian ice hockey player
Xavier Proctor (born 1990), American football player
Xavier Rhodes (born 1990), American football player
Xavier Rush (born 1977), New Zealand rugby player
Xavier Silas (born 1988), American basketball player
Xavier Quentin Shay Simons or Xavi Simons (born 2003), Dutch association football player
Xavier Thomas (born 1999), American football player
Xavier Tillman Sr. (born 1999), American basketball player
Xavier Woods (American football) (born 1995), American football player
Xavier Worthy (born 2003), American football player

Other
Xavier, Duke of Aquitaine (1753–1754)
Xabier Arzalluz (1932–2019), Basque nationalist politician
Xavier Bichat (1771–1802), French anatomist and pathologist
Xavier Briggs (born 1968), American sociologist
Xavier Chamorro Cardenal (1932–2008), Nicaraguan journalist
Xavier Ehrenbert Fridelli (1673–1743), Austrian Jesuit missionary
Xavier Fernique (1934–2020), French mathematician
Xavier Mertz (1882–1913), Swiss explorer
Xavier Roberts (born 1955), American inventor and manufacturer of Cabbage Patch Kids
Xavier Rolet (born 1959), French businessman and chief executive officer of the London Stock Exchange
Francis Xavier Seelos (1819–1867), German Roman Catholic missionary
Xavier Zubiri (1898–1983), Spanish philosopher

Fictional characters
Brigadier General Frank Xavier Hummel, antagonist of the film The Rock.
Xavier Austin, a character in the Australian soap opera Home and Away
Xavier Bird, a character in Joseph Boyden's novel Three Day Road
Xavier Desmond, a character in the George R. R. Martin book series Wild Cards
Xavier Dolls, a character in the supernatural Western TV series Wynonna Earp
Xavier, the main character of the animated series Xavier: Renegade Angel
Xavier March, protagonist of Robert Harris' novel Fatherland
Xavier Quinn, protagonist of the film The Mighty Quinn
Xavier Harkonnen, a character in the fictional Dune universe
Xavier Hutchinson, of the reality TV series Earth which premiered on the Seven Network in 1986
Xavier Benedict, a character in Julia Golding's Finding Sky book trilogy
Xavier Chavez, a character in the film Saw II
Xavier Riddle, the main character in the PBS Kids animated series Xavier Riddle and the Secret Museum
Xavier Thorpe, a character in the Netflix series Wednesday

See also
 Xavier (surname)
 Xavier (wrestler) (1977–2020), American wrestler
 Zavier Simpson (born 1997), American basketball player

In other languages
 Javier (Spanish, Portuguese)
 Ksaveras (Lithuanian)
 Ksaverij (Ксаверий) (Russian, Ukrainian)
 Ksawery (Polish)
 Xawery (Polish)
 Savielly (Polish)
 Saverio (Italian)
 Xabere, Xabel (Asturian)
 Xabier (Basque)
 Xaver (Czech, German, Slovakian)
 Xavér (Hungarian)
 Xaveriu (Romanian)
 Xaverius (Dutch, Latin)
 Sabelius (Latin)
 Xaveriοs (Ξαβέριος) or (Σαβέριος) (Greek)
 Xavier (Catalan, English, French, Portuguese, Galician, Swedish)

References

Basque masculine given names
French masculine given names
German masculine given names
Swiss masculine given names
English masculine given names